Bernard  Sanders (born September8, 1941) is an American politician serving as the senior United States senator from Vermont, a seat he has held since 2007. He was the U.S. representative for the state's at-large congressional district from 1991 to 2007. Sanders is the longest-serving independent in U.S. congressional history. He has a close relationship with the Democratic Party, having caucused with House and Senate Democrats for most of his congressional career. A self-described democratic socialist, he is often seen as a leader of the progressive movement in the United States. Sanders unsuccessfully sought the Democratic Party nomination for president of the United States in 2016 and 2020, finishing in second place in both campaigns. Before his election to Congress, he was mayor of Burlington, Vermont.

Born into a working-class Jewish family and raised in the Brooklyn borough of New York City, Sanders attended Brooklyn College before graduating from the University of Chicago in 1964. While a student, he was a protest organizer for the Congress of Racial Equality (CORE) and the Student Nonviolent Coordinating Committee (SNCC) during the civil rights movement. After settling in Vermont in 1968, he ran unsuccessful third-party political campaigns in the early to mid-1970s. He was elected mayor of Burlington in 1981 as an independent and was reelected three times. He won election to the U.S. House of Representatives in 1990, representing Vermont's at-large congressional district, later co-founding the Congressional Progressive Caucus. He served as a U.S. representative for 16 years before being elected to the U.S. Senate in 2006, notably becoming the first non-Republican elected to the seat in 152 years. Sanders was reelected to the Senate in 2012 and 2018. He chaired the Senate Veterans' Affairs Committee from 2013 to 2015 and the Senate Budget Committee from 2021 to 2023. In January 2023, he became chair of the Senate Health, Education, Labor and Pensions Committee, and the senior senator and dean of the Vermont congressional delegation upon Patrick Leahy's retirement from the Senate.

Sanders was a major candidate for the Democratic presidential nomination in 2016 and 2020. Despite initially low expectations, his 2016 campaign generated significant grassroots enthusiasm and funding from small-dollar donors, carrying him to victory against eventual nominee Hillary Clinton in 23 primaries and caucuses before he conceded in July. In 2020, his strong showing in early primaries and caucuses made him the front-runner in a historically large field of Democratic candidates. In April 2020, Sanders conceded the nomination to Joe Biden, who had won a series of decisive victories as the field narrowed. He supported both Clinton and Biden in their respective general election campaigns against Donald Trump.

Sanders self-identifies as a democratic socialist and has been credited with influencing a leftward shift in the Democratic Party after his 2016 presidential campaign. An advocate of social democratic and progressive policies, he is known for his opposition to economic inequality and neoliberalism. On domestic policy, he supports labor rights, universal and single-payer healthcare, paid parental leave, tuition-free tertiary education, and an ambitious Green New Deal to create jobs addressing climate change. On foreign policy, he supports reducing military spending, pursuing more diplomacy and international cooperation, and putting greater emphasis on labor rights and environmental concerns when negotiating international trade agreements. Sanders supports workplace democracy, and has praised elements of the Nordic model. Some have compared his politics to left-wing populism and the New Deal policies of President Franklin D. Roosevelt.

Early life

Bernard Sanders was born on September 8, 1941, in the Brooklyn borough of New York City. His father, Elias Ben Yehuda Sanders (1904–1962), was born in Słopnice, a town in Austrian Galicia that was then part of the Austro-Hungarian Empire and is now in Poland. Elias Sanders immigrated to the United States in 1921 and became a paint salesman. Bernie's mother, Dorothy Sanders (1912–1960), was born in New York City. He is the younger brother of Larry Sanders.

Sanders says he became interested in politics at an early age due to his family background. In the 1940s, many of his relatives in German-occupied Poland were murdered in the Holocaust.

Sanders lived in Midwood, Brooklyn. He attended elementary school at P.S. 197, where he won a borough championship on the basketball team. He attended Hebrew school in the afternoons, and celebrated his bar mitzvah in 1954. His older brother Larry said that during their childhood, the family never lacked for food or clothing, but major purchases, "like curtains or a rug", were not affordable.

Sanders attended James Madison High School, where he was captain of the track team and took third place in the New York City indoor one-mile race. In high school, he lost his first election, finishing last of three candidates for the student body presidency with a campaign that focused on aiding Korean War orphans. Despite the loss, he became active in his school's fundraising activities for Korean orphans, including organizing a charity basketball game. Sanders attended high school with economist Walter Block. When he was 19, his mother died at age 46. His father died two years later in 1962 at age 57.

Sanders studied at Brooklyn College for a year in 1959–1960 before transferring to the University of Chicago and graduating with a Bachelor of Arts degree in political science in 1964. In later interviews, Sanders described himself as a mediocre college student because the classroom was "boring and irrelevant", and said he viewed community activism as more important to his education.

Early career

Political activism

Sanders later described his time in Chicago as "the major period of intellectual ferment in my life." While there, he joined the Young People's Socialist League (the youth affiliate of the Socialist Party of America) and was active in the civil rights movement as a student for the Congress of Racial Equality (CORE) and the Student Nonviolent Coordinating Committee (SNCC). Under his chairmanship, the university chapter of CORE merged with the university chapter of the SNCC. In January 1962, he went to a rally at the University of Chicago administration building to protest university president George Wells Beadle's segregated campus housing policy. At the protest, Sanders said, "We feel it is an intolerable situation when Negro and white students of the university cannot live together in university-owned apartments". He and 32 other students then entered the building and camped outside the president's office. After weeks of sit-ins, Beadle and the university formed a commission to investigate discrimination. After further protests, the University of Chicago ended racial segregation in private university housing in the summer of 1963.

Joan Mahoney, a member of the University of Chicago CORE chapter at the time and a fellow participant in the sit-ins, described Sanders in a 2016 interview as "a swell guy, a nice Jewish boy from Brooklyn, but he wasn't terribly charismatic. One of his strengths, though, was his ability to work with a wide group of people, even those he didn't agree with." Sanders once spent a day putting up fliers protesting police brutality, only to notice later that Chicago police had shadowed him and taken them all down. He attended the 1963 March on Washington for Jobs and Freedom, where Martin Luther King Jr. gave the "I Have a Dream" speech. That summer, Sanders was fined $25 for resisting arrest during a demonstration in Englewood against segregation in Chicago's public schools.

In addition to his civil rights activism during the 1960s and 1970s, Sanders was active in several peace and antiwar movements while attending the University of Chicago, becoming a member of the Student Peace Union. He applied for conscientious objector status during the Vietnam War; his application was eventually turned down, by which point he was too old to be drafted. Although he opposed the war, Sanders never criticized those who fought in it, and has strongly supported veterans' benefits throughout his political career. He also was briefly an organizer with the United Packinghouse Workers of America while in Chicago. He also worked on the reelection campaign of Leon Despres, a prominent Chicago alderman who opposed then-mayor Richard J. Daley's Democratic Party machine. Sanders said that he spent much of his student years reading history, sociology, psychology, and the works of political authors, from Thomas Jefferson, Abraham Lincoln, John Dewey, Karl Marx, and Erich Fromm—"reading everything except what I was supposed to read for class the next day."

Professional history and early years in Vermont
After graduating from college, Sanders returned to New York City, where he worked various jobs, including Head Start teacher, psychiatric aide, and carpenter. In 1968, he moved to Stannard, Vermont, a town small in both area and population (88 residents at the 1970 census) within Vermont's rural Northeast Kingdom region, because he had been "captivated by rural life". While there, he worked as a carpenter, filmmaker, and writer who created and sold "radical film strips" and other educational materials to schools. He also wrote several articles for the alternative publication The Vermont Freeman. He lived in the area for several years before moving to the more populous Chittenden County in the mid-1970s. During his 2018 reelection campaign, he returned to the town to hold an event with voters and other candidates.

Liberty Union campaigns
Sanders began his electoral political career in 1971 as a member of the Liberty Union Party, a national umbrella party for various socialist-oriented state parties, originating in the anti-war movement and the People's Party. He ran as the Liberty Union candidate for governor of Vermont in 1972 and 1976 and as a candidate in the special election for U.S. senator in 1972 and in the general election in 1974. In the 1974 senatorial race, he finished third (5,901 votes; 4%), behind 33-year-old Chittenden County state's attorney Patrick Leahy (D; 70,629 votes; 49%) and two-term incumbent U.S. Representative Dick Mallary (R; 66,223 votes; 46%).

The 1976 campaign was the zenith of the Liberty Union's influence, with Sanders collecting 11,317 votes for governor and the party. His strong performance forced the down-ballot races for lieutenant governor and secretary of state to be decided by the state legislature when its vote total prevented either the Republican or Democratic candidate for those offices from garnering a majority of votes. The campaign drained the finances and energy of the Liberty Union, however, and in October 1977, less than a year after the 1976 campaign concluded, he and the Liberty Union candidate for attorney general, Nancy Kaufman, announced their retirement from the party. During the 1980 presidential election, Sanders served as one of three electors for the Socialist Workers Party in Vermont.

After his resignation from the Liberty Union Party in 1977, Sanders worked as a writer and as the director of the nonprofit American People's Historical Society (APHS). While with the APHS, he produced a 30-minute documentary about American labor leader Eugene V. Debs, who ran for president five times as the Socialist Party candidate.

Mayor of Burlington, Vermont (1981–1989)

Campaigns
On November 8, 1980, Sanders announced his candidacy for mayor. He formally announced his campaign on December 16 at a City Hall press conference. Sanders selected Linda Niedweske as his campaign manager. The Citizens Party attempted to nominate Greg Guma for mayor, but Guma declined, saying it would be "difficult to run against another progressive candidate". Sanders had been convinced to run for the mayoralty by his close friend Richard Sugarman, an Orthodox Jewish professor of religious studies at the University of Vermont, who had shown him a ward-by-ward breakdown of the 1976 Vermont gubernatorial election, in which Sanders had run, that showed him receiving 12% of the vote in Burlington despite only getting 6% statewide.

Sanders initially won the mayoral election by 22 votes against Paquette, Bove, and McGrath, but the margin was later reduced to 10 votes. Paquette did not contest the results of the recount.

Paquette's loss was attributed to his own shortcomings, as he did not campaign or promote his candidacy since both Sanders and Independent candidate Richard Bove were not seen as a serious challengers, as Sanders had not previously won an election. Paquette was also considered to have lost because he proposed an unpopular $0.65 per $100 raise in taxes that Sanders opposed. Sanders spent around $4,000 on his campaign.

Sanders castigated the pro-development incumbent as an ally of prominent shopping center developer Antonio Pomerleau, while Paquette warned of ruin for Burlington if Sanders were elected. The Sanders campaign was bolstered by a wave of optimistic volunteers as well as a series of endorsements from university professors, social welfare agencies, and the police union. The result shocked the local political establishment.

Sanders formed a coalition between independents and the Citizens Party. On December 3, 1982, he announced that he would seek reelection. On January 22, 1983, the Citizens Party voted unanimously to endorse Sanders, although Sanders ran as an independent. He was reelected, defeating Judy Stephany and James Gilson.

Sanders initially considered not seeking a third term, but announced on December 5, 1984, that he would run. He formally launched his campaign on December 7, and was reelected. On December 1, 1986, Sanders, who had finished third in the 1986 Vermont gubernatorial election, announced that he would seek reelection to a fourth term as mayor of Burlington, despite close associates stating that he was tired of being mayor. Sanders defeated Democratic nominee Paul Lafayette in the election. He said he would not seek another mayoral term after the 1987 election: "eight years is enough and I think it is time for new leadership, which does exist within the coalition, to come up".

Sanders did not run for a fifth term as mayor. He went on to lecture in political science at Harvard Kennedy School that year and at Hamilton College in 1991.

Administration
During his mayoralty, Sanders called himself a socialist and was so described in the press. During his first term, his supporters, including the first Citizens Party city councilor Terry Bouricius, formed the Progressive Coalition, the forerunner of the Vermont Progressive Party. The Progressives never held more than six seats on the 13-member city council, but they had enough to keep the council from overriding Sanders's vetoes. Under his leadership, Burlington balanced its city budget; attracted a minor league baseball team, the Vermont Reds, then the Double-A affiliate of the Cincinnati Reds; became the first U.S. city to fund community-trust housing; and successfully sued the local cable television franchise, thereby winning reduced rates for customers.

As mayor, Sanders also led extensive downtown revitalization projects. One of his primary achievements was improving Burlington's Lake Champlain waterfront. In 1981, he campaigned against the unpopular plans by Burlington developer Tony Pomerleau to convert the then-industrial waterfront property owned by the Central Vermont Railway into expensive condominiums, hotels, and offices. He ran under the slogan "Burlington is not for sale" and successfully supported a plan that redeveloped the waterfront area into a mixed-use district featuring housing, parks, and public spaces.

Sanders was a consistent critic of U.S. foreign policy in Latin America throughout the 1980s. In 1985, Burlington City Hall hosted a foreign policy speech by Noam Chomsky. In his introduction, he praised Chomsky as "a very vocal and important voice in the wilderness of intellectual life in America" and said that he was "delighted to welcome a person who I think we're all very proud of."

Sanders hosted and produced a public-access television program, Bernie Speaks with the Community, from 1986 to 1988. He collaborated with 30 Vermont musicians to record a folk album, We Shall Overcome, in 1987. That same year, U.S. News & World Report ranked Sanders one of America's best mayors. , Burlington was regarded as one of the most livable cities in the United States.

When Sanders left office in 1989, Bouricius, a member of the Burlington city council, said that Sanders had "changed the entire nature of politics in Burlington and also in the state of Vermont".

U.S. House of Representatives (1991–2007)

Elections
In 1988, incumbent Republican congressman Jim Jeffords decided to run for the U.S. Senate, vacating the House seat representing Vermont's at-large congressional district. Former Lieutenant Governor Peter P. Smith won the House election with a plurality, securing 41% of the vote. Sanders, who ran as an independent, placed second with 38% of the vote, while Democratic state representative Paul N. Poirier placed third with 19%. Two years later, he ran for the seat again and defeated Smith by a margin of 56% to 39%.

Sanders was the first independent elected to the U.S. House of Representatives since Frazier Reams of Ohio won his second term in 1952, as well as the first socialist elected to the House since Vito Marcantonio, from the American Labor Party, who won his last term in 1948. Sanders served as a representative from 1991 until he became a senator in 2007, winning reelection by large margins except during the 1994 Republican Revolution, when he won by 3%, with 50% of the vote.

Legislation

During his first year in the House, Sanders often alienated allies and colleagues with his criticism of both political parties as working primarily on behalf of the wealthy. In 1991, he co-founded the Congressional Progressive Caucus, a group of mostly liberal Democrats that he chaired for its first eight years, while still refusing to join the Democratic Party or caucus.

In 2005, Rolling Stone called Sanders the "amendment king" for his ability to get more roll call amendments passed than any other congressman during the period since 1995, when Congress was entirely under Republican control. Being an independent allowed him to form coalitions across party lines.

Banking reform
In 1999, Sanders voted and advocated against rolling back the Glass–Steagall legislation provisions that kept investment banks and commercial banks separate entities. He was a vocal critic of Federal Reserve Chair Alan Greenspan; in June 2003, during a question-and-answer discussion, Sanders told him he was concerned that he was "way out of touch" and "that you see your major function in your position as the need to represent the wealthy and large corporations."

Cancer registries
Concerned by high breast cancer rates in Vermont, on February 7, 1992, Sanders sponsored the Cancer Registries Amendment Act to establish cancer registries to collect data on cancer. Senator Patrick Leahy introduced a companion bill in the Senate on October 2, 1992. The Senate bill was passed by the House on October 6 and signed into law by President George H. W. Bush on October 24, 1992.

Firearms and criminal justice
In 1993, Sanders voted against the Brady Bill, which mandated federal background checks when buying guns and imposed a waiting period on firearm purchasers in the United States; the bill passed by a vote of 238–187. He voted against the bill four more times in the 1990s, explaining his Vermont constituents saw waiting-period mandates as more appropriately a state than federal matter.

Sanders did vote for other gun-control measures. For example, in 1994, he voted for the Violent Crime Control and Law Enforcement Act "because it included the Violence Against Women Act and the ban on certain assault weapons." He was nevertheless critical of the other parts of the bill. Although he acknowledged that "clearly, there are some people in our society who are horribly violent, who are deeply sick and sociopathic, and clearly these people must be put behind bars in order to protect society from them", he maintained that governmental policies played a large part in "dooming tens of millions of young people to a future of bitterness, misery, hopelessness, drugs, crime, and violence" and argued that the repressive policies introduced by the bill were not addressing the causes of violence, saying, "we can create meaningful jobs, rebuilding our society, or we can build more jails."

Sanders has at times favored stronger law enforcement and sentencing. In 1996, he voted against a bill that would have prohibited police from purchasing tanks and armored carriers. In 1998, he voted for a bill that would have increased minimum sentencing for possessing a gun while committing a federal crime to ten years in prison, including nonviolent crimes such as marijuana possession.

In 2005, Sanders voted for the Protection of Lawful Commerce in Arms Act. The purpose of the act was to prevent firearms manufacturers and dealers from being held liable for negligence when crimes have been committed with their products. , he said that he has since changed his position and would vote for legislation to defeat this bill.

Opposition to the Patriot Act
Sanders was a consistent critic of the Patriot Act. As a member of Congress, he voted against the original Patriot Act legislation. After its 357–66 passage in the House, he sponsored and voted for several subsequent amendments and acts attempting to curtail its effects and voted against each reauthorization. In June 2005, he proposed an amendment to limit Patriot Act provisions that allow the government to obtain individuals' library and book-buying records. The amendment passed the House by a bipartisan majority, but was removed on November4 of that year in House–Senate negotiations and never became law.

Opposition to the War in Iraq
Sanders voted against the resolutions authorizing the use of force against Iraq in 1991 and 2002, and he opposed the 2003 invasion of Iraq. He voted for the 2001 Authorization for Use of Military Force Against Terrorists that has been cited as the legal justification for controversial military actions since the September 11 attacks. He especially opposed the Bush administration's decision to start a war unilaterally.

Trade policy
In February 2005, Sanders introduced a bill that would have withdrawn the permanent normal trade relations (PNTR) status that had been extended to China in October 2000. He said to the House, "Anyone who takes an objective look at our trade policy with China must conclude that it is an absolute failure and needs to be fundamentally overhauled", citing the American jobs being lost to overseas competitors. His bill received 71 co-sponsors but was not sent to the floor for a vote.

U.S. Senate (2007–present)

Elections

2006

Sanders entered the race for the U.S. Senate on April 21, 2005, after Senator Jim Jeffords announced that he would not seek a fourth term. Chuck Schumer, chair of the Democratic Senatorial Campaign Committee and fellow James Madison High School alumnus, endorsed Sanders. This was a critical move because it meant no Democrat running against him could expect financial help from the party. He was also endorsed by Senate Minority Leader Harry Reid and Democratic National Committee chair and former Vermont governor Howard Dean. Dean said in May 2005 that he considered Sanders an ally who "votes with the Democrats 98% of the time." Then-Senator Barack Obama also campaigned for him in Vermont in March 2006. Sanders entered into an agreement with the Democratic Party, much as he had as a congressman, to be listed in their primary but to decline the nomination should he win, which he did.

In the most expensive political campaign in Vermont's history, Sanders defeated businessman Rich Tarrant by an almost 2-to-1 margin. Many national media outlets projected him as the winner just after the polls closed, before any returns came in.

2012

Sanders was reelected in 2012 with 71% of the vote.

2018

Sanders was reelected in 2018 with 67% of the vote.

Legislation
While a member of Congress, Sanders sponsored 15 concurrent resolutions and 15 Senate resolutions. Of those he co-sponsored, 218 became law. While he has consistently advocated for progressive causes, Politico wrote that he has "rarely forged actual legislation or left a significant imprint on it." According to The New York Times, "Big legislation largely eludes Mr. Sanders because his ideas are usually far to the left of the majority of the Senate ... Mr. Sanders has largely found ways to press his agenda through appending small provisions to the larger bills of others." During his time in the Senate, he had lower legislative effectiveness than the average senator, as measured by the number of sponsored bills that passed and successful amendments made. Nevertheless, he has sponsored over 500 amendments to bills, many of which became law. The results of these amendments include a ban on imported goods made by child labor; $100 million in funding for community health centers; $10 million for an outreach program for servicemembers who have posttraumatic stress disorder, traumatic brain injury, depression, panic attacks, and other mental disorders; a public database of senior Department of Defense officials seeking employment with defense contractors; and including autism treatment in the military healthcare program.

In August 2022, Sanders voted for the Inflation Reduction Act of 2022. He was not satisfied with the bill, calling it only a small step forward.

Finance and monetary policy
In 2008 and 2009, Sanders voted against the Troubled Asset Relief Program (TARP), a program to purchase toxic banking assets and provide loans to banks that were in free-fall. On February 4, 2009, he sponsored an amendment to ensure that TARP funds would not displace U.S. workers. The amendment passed and was added to the American Recovery and Reinvestment Act of 2009. Among his proposed financial reforms is auditing the Federal Reserve, which would reduce its independence in monetary policy deliberations; Federal Reserve officials say that "Audit the Fed" legislation would expose the Federal Reserve to undue political pressure from lawmakers who do not like its decisions.

On December 10, 2010, Sanders delivered an 8 hour and 34 minute speech against the Tax Relief, Unemployment Insurance Reauthorization, and Job Creation Act of 2010, which proposed extending the Bush-era tax rates. He argued that the legislation would favor the wealthiest Americans. "Enough is enough! ... How many homes can you own?" he asked. Nevertheless, the bill passed the Senate with a strong majority and was signed into law a week later. In February 2011, Nation Books published the speech as The Speech: A Historic Filibuster on Corporate Greed and the Decline of Our Middle Class, with authorial proceeds going to Vermont nonprofit charitable organizations.

In 2016, Sanders voted for the Federal Reserve Transparency Act, which included proposals for a reformed audit of the Federal Reserve System.

Foreign policy
On June 12, 2017, U.S. senators agreed to legislation imposing new sanctions on Russia and Iran. The bill was opposed only by Sanders and Republican Rand Paul. He supported the sanctions on Russia, but voted against the bill because he believed the sanctions could endanger the Iran nuclear deal.

In 2018, Sanders sponsored a bill and was joined by Senators Chris Murphy (D–CT) and Mike Lee (R–UT) to invoke the 1973 War Powers Resolution to end U.S. support for the Saudi-led military intervention in Yemen, which has resulted in hundreds of thousands of civilian casualties and "millions more suffering from starvation and disease". After the assassination of Jamal Khashoggi in October 2018 (which was ordered by Saudi Arabian Crown Prince Mohammad bin Salman, according to multiple intelligence agencies), his bill attracted bipartisan co-sponsors and support, and the Senate passed it by a vote of 56–41. The bill passed the House in February 2019 by a 247–175 vote and President Trump vetoed it in March, saying: "This resolution is an unnecessary, dangerous attempt to weaken my constitutional authorities, endangering the lives of American citizens and brave service members, both today and in the future."

Health care

In mid-December 2009, Sanders successfully added a provision to the Affordable Care Act to fund $11 billion to community health centers, especially those in rural areas. The provision brought together Democrats on the left with Democrats from conservative, rural areas, helping to secure the 60 votes needed for passage. On May 4, 2017, in response to the House vote to repeal and replace the Affordable Care Act, he predicted "thousands of Americans would die" from no longer having access to health care. PolitiFact rated his statement "mostly true".

In September 2017, Sanders along with 15 Senate co-sponsors submitted the Medicare for All bill, a single-payer healthcare plan. The bill covers vision and dental care, unlike Medicare. Some Republicans have called the bill "Berniecare" and "the latest Democratic push for socialized medicine and higher taxes." He responded that the Republican Party has no credibility on the issue of health care after voting for legislation that would take health insurance away from 32 million Americans under the Affordable Care Act.

As chairman of the Senate Subcommittee on Primary Health and Aging, Sanders introduced legislation in 2013 to reauthorize and strengthen the Older Americans Act, which supports Meals on Wheels and other programs for seniors.

Immigration policy
In 2007, Sanders helped kill a bill introducing comprehensive immigration reform, arguing that its guest-worker program would depress wages for American workers. In 2010, he supported the DREAM Act, which would have provided a path to citizenship for undocumented immigrants who had been brought to the United States as minors. In 2013, he supported the Gang of Eight's comprehensive immigration reform bill after securing a $1.5 billion youth jobs program provision, which he argued would offset the harm of labor market competition with immigrants.

Income and wealth distribution

In April 2017, Sanders introduced a bill that would raise the minimum wage for federal contract workers to $15 an hour, an increase over an earlier Democratic $12 an hour proposal. On May 9, 2018, he introduced the Workplace Democracy Act, a bill that would expand labor rights by making it easier for workers to join a union, ban right-to-work laws and some anti-union provisions of the Taft–Hartley Act, and outlaw some union-busting tactics. Announcing the legislation, he said, "If we are serious about reducing income and wealth inequality and rebuilding the middle class, we have got to substantially increase the number of union jobs in this country."

Sanders opposed the 2018 United States federal budget proposed by the Trump administration, calling it "a budget for the billionaire class, for Wall Street, for corporate CEOs, and for the wealthiest people in this country ... nothing less than a massive transfer of wealth from working families, the elderly, children, the sick and the poor to the top 1%."

After the November 2017 revelations from the Paradise Papers and a recent report from the Institute for Policy Studies which says just three people (Jeff Bezos, Bill Gates, and Warren Buffett) own more wealth than the bottom half of the U.S. population, Sanders stated that "we must end global oligarchy" and that "we need, in the United States and throughout the world, a tax system which is fair, progressive and transparent."

On September 5, 2018, Sanders partnered with Ro Khanna to introduce the Stop Bad Employers by Zeroing Out Subsidies (Stop BEZOS) Act, which would require large corporations to pay for the food stamps and Medicaid benefits that their employees receive, relieving the burden on taxpayers.

Veterans affairs

On June 9, 2014, Sanders sponsored the Veterans' Access to Care through Choice, Accountability, and Transparency Act of 2014 to reform the Department of Veterans Affairs in the wake of the Veterans Health Administration scandal of 2014. He worked with Senator John McCain, who co-sponsored the bill. His bill was incorporated into the House version of the bill, which passed both chambers on July 31, 2014, and was signed into law by President Obama on August 7, 2014.

Supreme Court nominees
On March 17, 2016, Sanders said he would support Merrick Garland's nomination to the Supreme Court, though he added, "there are some more progressive judges out there." He opposed Neil Gorsuch's nomination to the court, saying that Gorsuch had "refused to answer legitimate questions". He also objected to Senate Republicans' use of the nuclear option to "choke off debate and ram [Gorsuch's] nomination through the Senate". He voted against Gorsuch's confirmation as an associate justice, and against Trump's nominees Brett Kavanaugh and Amy Coney Barrett. In 2022, Sanders voted to confirm Joe Biden's nominee Ketanji Brown Jackson to the Supreme Court.

Committee assignments
As an independent, Sanders maintains an agreement with the Senate Democratic leadership where he votes with the Democrats on all procedural matters unless the Democratic whip, Dick Durbin, agrees that he need not (a request rarely made or granted). In return he was allowed to keep his seniority and received the committee seats that would have been available to him as a Democrat; in 2013–14 he was chairman of the United States Senate Committee on Veterans' Affairs (during the Veterans Health Administration scandal).

Sanders became the ranking minority member on the Senate Budget Committee in 2015 and the chair in 2021; he previously chaired the Senate Veterans' Affairs Committee for two years. Since 2017, he has been chair of the Senate Democratic Outreach Committee. He appointed economics professor Stephanie Kelton, a modern monetary theory scholar, as the chief economic adviser for the committee's Democratic minority and presented a report about helping "rebuild the disappearing middle class" that included proposals to raise the minimum wage, boost infrastructure spending, and increase Social Security payments.

, Sanders's committee assignments are as follows:
 Committee on the Budget (former chair)
 Committee on Energy and Natural Resources
 Subcommittee on Energy
 Subcommittee on National Parks
 Subcommittee on Water and Power
 Committee on Environment and Public Works
 Subcommittee on Clean Air and Nuclear Safety
 Subcommittee on Green Jobs and the New Economy
 Subcommittee on Transportation and Infrastructure
 Committee on Health, Education, Labor, and Pensions (chair)
 Subcommittee on Children and Families
 Subcommittee on Primary Health and Retirement Security
 Committee on Veterans' Affairs (former chair)

Caucus memberships
Sanders was only the third senator from Vermont to caucus with the Democrats, after Jeffords and Leahy. His caucusing with the Democrats gave them a 51–49 majority in the Senate during the 110th Congress in 2007–08. The Democrats needed 51 seats to control the Senate because Vice President Dick Cheney would likely have broken potential ties in favor of the Republicans. He is a member of the following caucuses:
 Congressional Progressive Caucus
 Democratic Caucus of the United States Senate
 United States Senate Afterschool Caucus

Approval ratings
Polling conducted in August 2011 by Public Policy Polling found that Sanders's approval rating was 67% and his disapproval rating 28%, making him then the third-most popular U.S. senator. Both the NAACP (National Association for the Advancement of Colored People) and the NHLA (National Hispanic Leadership Agenda) have given him 100% voting scores during his tenure in the Senate. In 2015, he was named one of the Top5 of The Forward 50. In a November 2015 Morning Consult poll, he reached an 83% approval rating among his constituents, making him the most popular U.S. senator. Fox News found him to have the highest net favorability at +28 points of any prominent politician included in its March 2017 poll. He ranked third in 2014 and first in both 2015 and 2016.

In April 2017, a nationwide Harvard-Harris Poll found that Sanders had the highest favorability rating among all the political figures included in the poll, a standing confirmed by subsequent polling.

2016 presidential campaign

During the 2012 Democratic presidential primaries, Sanders—dissatisfied with President Obama's "attempts to trade Social Security cuts for tax hikes"—reportedly considered running against him in the primaries. Sanders had previously suggested in 2011 that it was "a good idea" for someone to challenge Obama, and "got so close to running a primary challenge ... that Senator Harry Reid had to intervene to stop him." In November 2013, Sanders suggested that Senator Elizabeth Warren could be president and that she might earn his backing if she ran. He added that if no progressive candidate ran, he might feel compelled to do so himself. In December 2014, Warren said she was not running.

Sanders announced his intention to seek the Democratic Party's nomination for president on April 30, 2015. His campaign was officially launched on May 26 in Burlington. In his announcement Sanders said, "I don't believe that the men and women who defended American democracy fought to create a situation where billionaires own the political process", and made this a central idea throughout his campaign.

Warren welcomed Sanders's entry into the race, saying, "I'm glad to see him get out there and give his version of what leadership in this country should be", but never endorsed him.

Initially considered a long shot, Sanders won 23 primaries and caucuses and around 46% of pledged delegates to Hillary Clinton's 54%. His campaign was noted for its supporters' enthusiasm, as well as for rejecting large donations from corporations, the financial industry, and any associated Super PAC. Some of the Democratic National Committee (DNC) emails leaked to the public in June and July 2016 showed that the committee leadership had favored Clinton over him and had worked to help Clinton win the nomination.

On July 12, 2016, Sanders formally endorsed Clinton in her unsuccessful general election campaign against Republican Donald Trump, while urging his supporters to continue the "political revolution" his campaign had begun.

Campaign methods
Unlike the other major candidates, Sanders did not pursue funding through a Super PAC or from wealthy donors, instead focusing on small-dollar donations. His presidential campaign raised $1.5 million within 24 hours of his official announcement. At the end of the year, the campaign had raised a total of $73 million from more than one million people, making 2.5 million donations, with an average donation of $27.16. The campaign reached 3.25 million donations by the end of January 2016, raising $20 million in that month alone.

Sanders used social media to help his campaign gain momentum, posting content to online platforms such as Twitter and Facebook and answering questions on Reddit. He gained a large grassroots organizational following online. A July 29, 2015, meetup organized online brought 100,000 supporters to more than 3,500 simultaneous events nationwide.

To his surprise, Sanders's June 2015 campaign events drew overflow crowds across the country. When Clinton and Sanders made public appearances within days of each other in Des Moines, Iowa, he drew larger crowds, even though he had already made many stops around the state and Clinton's visit was her first in 2015. On July 1, 2015, his campaign stop in Madison, Wisconsin, drew the largest crowd of any 2016 presidential candidate to that date, with an estimated turnout of 10,000. Over the following weeks, he drew even larger crowds: 11,000 in Phoenix; 15,000 in Seattle; and 28,000 in Portland, Oregon.

Presidential debates

The Democratic National Committee (DNC) announced in May 2015 that there would be six debates. Critics alleged that the small number of debates and the schedule, with half of the debates on Saturday or Sunday nights, were part of the DNC's deliberate attempt to protect Clinton, who was perceived as the front-runner. In February 2016, both the Clinton and Sanders campaigns agreed in principle to holding four more debates for a total of ten. Clinton dropped out of the tenth debate, scheduled to take place just before the California primary, citing a need to devote her time to making direct contact with California voters and preparing for the general election. Sanders expressed disappointment that Clinton canceled the debate before what he believed would be "the largest and most important primary in the presidential nominating process."

Polls and news coverage

Some Sanders supporters raised concerns that publications such as The New York Times minimized coverage of the Sanders campaign in favor of other candidates, especially Trump and Clinton. The Times ombudsman reviewed her paper's coverage of the Sanders campaign and found that  the Times "hasn't always taken it very seriously. The tone of some stories is regrettably dismissive, even mocking at times. Some of that is focused on the candidate's age, appearance and style, rather than what he has to say." She also found that the Times coverage of Sanders's campaign was much scanter than its coverage of Trump's, though Trump's was also initially considered a long shot at that time, with 63 articles covering the Trump campaign and 14 covering Sanders's. A December 2015 report found that the three major networks—CBS, NBC, and ABC—had spent 234 minutes reporting on Trump and 10 minutes on Sanders, despite their similar polling results. The report noted that ABC World News Tonight had spent 81 minutes on Trump and less than one minute on Sanders during 2015.

A study of media coverage in the 2016 election concluded that while Sanders received less coverage than his rival Hillary Clinton, the amount of coverage of Sanders during the election was largely consistent with his polling performance, except during 2015 when Sanders received coverage that far exceeded his standing in the polls. Studies concluded that the tone of media coverage of Sanders was more favorable than that of any other candidate, whereas his main opponent in the democratic primary, Hillary Clinton, received the most negative coverage of any candidate. All 2016 candidates received vastly less media coverage than Donald Trump, and the Democratic primary received substantially less coverage than the Republican primary.

Amy Goodman of Democracy Now! noted that on March 15, Super Tuesday III, the speeches of Trump, Clinton, Marco Rubio, and Ted Cruz were broadcast in full. Sanders was in Phoenix, Arizona, on that date, speaking to a rally larger than any of the others, yet his speech was not mentioned, let alone broadcast. However, political scientist Rachel Bitecofer wrote in her 2018 book about the 2016 election that the Democratic primary was effectively over in terms of delegate count by mid-March 2016, but that the media promoted the narrative that the contest between Sanders and Clinton was "heating up" at that time.

An NBC/Wall Street Journal poll conducted in May 2016 found Clinton and Trump (by then the presumptive Republican nominee) in a "dead heat", but the same poll found that if Sanders were the Democratic nominee, 53% of voters would support him to 39% for Trump. Clinton and Trump were the least popular likely candidates ever polled, while Sanders received a 43% positive, 36% negative rating. Polls showed that Democratic voters older than 50 preferred Clinton by a large margin but that those under 50 overwhelmingly favored Sanders. A 2017 analysis in Newsweek found that 12% of those who voted for Sanders in the Democratic primary voted for Trump in the general election, a lower proportion than that of Clinton supporters in 2008 who voted for John McCain.

DNC email leak

In July 2016, a leak of the Democratic National Committee's emails appeared to show DNC officials favoring Clinton over Sanders. Staff repeatedly discussed making his irreligious tendencies a potential campaign issue in southern states and questioned his party loyalty. DNC chair Debbie Wasserman Schultz called his campaign manager "an ass" and "a damn liar". Speaking with Jake Tapper on CNN, Sanders responded to the leak, saying, "it is an outrage and sad that you would have people in important positions in the DNC trying to undermine my campaign. It goes without saying: the function of the DNC is to represent all of the candidates—to be fair and even-minded. But again, we discussed this many, many months ago, on this show, so what is revealed now is not a shock to me."

Endorsement of Hillary Clinton

After the final primary election, Clinton became the presumptive Democratic nominee. On July 12, Sanders formally endorsed Clinton. He said he would continue to work with the Democratic National Convention organizers to implement progressive positions. Sanders refused to formally concede before the convention. He spoke at the 2016 Democratic National Convention on July 25, during which he gave Clinton his full support. Some of his supporters attempted to protest Clinton's nomination and booed when Sanders called for party unity. He responded, "Our job is to do two things: to defeat Donald Trump and to elect Hillary Clinton... It is easy to boo, but it is harder to look your kids in the face if we are living under a Trump presidency."

On November 8, in the general election, Sanders received almost 6% of the vote in Vermont, even though he was no longer a candidate. This was the highest share of a statewide presidential vote for a write-in draft campaign in American history. He also received more votes in Vermont than Gary Johnson, the Libertarian candidate, and Jill Stein, the Green candidate, combined. It was possible to vote for Sanders as a write-in candidate in 12 states, and exact totals of write-in votes for him were published in three of them: California, New Hampshire, and Vermont. In those three states, he received 111,850 write-in votes, about 15% of the write-in votes nationwide, and less than 1% of total nationwide vote.

Post-election activities
In November 2016, Sanders's book Our Revolution: A Future to Believe In was released; upon its release, it was number three on The New York Times Best Seller list. The audiobook later received a Grammy nomination for Best Spoken Word Album. In February 2017, he began webcasting The Bernie Sanders Show on Facebook live streaming. , guests had included William Barber, Josh Fox, Jane Mayer, and Bill Nye. Polls taken in 2017 found him to be the most popular politician in the United States.

In February 2018, Special Counsel Robert Mueller's investigation into Russian interference in the 2016 U.S. elections concluded that Russians had communicated false information during the primary campaigns to help Sanders and Stein and harm Clinton. Sanders rejected the investigation's conclusion, saying that he had seen no evidence that Russians had helped his campaign. Furthermore, he blamed the Clinton campaign for not doing more to prevent Russian interference. He later said that his campaign had taken action to prevent Russian meddling in the election and that a campaign staffer had alerted the Clinton campaign. Politico noted that a Sanders campaign volunteer contacted a political action committee (PAC) that supported the Clinton campaign to report suspicious activities but that the Sanders campaign did not contact the Clinton campaign as such.

In November 2018, the Sanders Institute and Yanis Varoufakis, co-founder of DiEM25, launched Progressive International, an international organization uniting progressive activists and organizations "to mobilize people around the world to transform the global order and the institutions that shape it."

Influence on the Democratic Party
Analysts have suggested that Sanders's campaign shifted both the Clinton campaign and the Democratic Party politically leftward. A new political organization, Brand New Congress, was formed in April 2016 by former campaign staffers. It works to elect congressional representatives with platforms in line with Sanders. In August 2016, he formed Our Revolution, a political organization dedicated to educating voters about issues, getting people involved in the political process, and electing progressive candidates for local, state, and national office. Speaking on the PBS Newshour about the upcoming 2018 elections and discussing the main principles of the two major parties, Susan Page described the Republican Party as "Trump's party" and the Democratic Party as "Bernie Sanders's party", saying that "Sanders and his more progressive stance has really taken hold." Noting the increasing acceptance of his national single-payer health-care program, his $15-an-hour minimum wage stance, free college tuition and many of the other campaign platform issues he introduced, an April 2018 opinion article in The Week suggested, "Quietly but steadily, the Democratic Party is admitting that Sanders was right." In July 2016, a Slate article called the Democratic platform draft "a monument to his campaign", noting not only his call for a $15 minimum wage, but other campaign issues, such as Social Security expansion, a carbon tax, Wall Street reform, opposition to the death penalty, and a "reasoned pathway for future legalization" of marijuana.

Sanders's presidential campaigns led to a resurgence of interest in social democracy and democratic socialism among millennials.

2020 presidential campaign

On February 19, 2019, Sanders announced that he would seek the Democratic Party's 2020 nomination for president. He had declined the Vermont Democratic Party nomination for U.S. Senate in 2006, 2012, and 2018, which caused an unsuccessful legal challenge to his candidacy for the Democratic presidential nomination in 2016. Along with his 2019 campaign announcement, he said he would abide by a new Democratic Party rule for presidential candidates and that he would affirm his membership in that party. On March 5, 2019, he signed a formal statement, known as a "loyalty pledge", that he is a member of the Democratic Party and will serve as a Democrat if elected. News reports noted that the day before, he had signed paperwork to run as an independent for reelection to his Senate seat in 2024.

Sanders's campaign manager was Faiz Shakir. The campaign's national co-chairs were Ben & Jerry's co-founder Ben Cohen, Representative Ro Khanna, Our Revolution President Nina Turner, and San Juan mayor Carmen Yulín Cruz.

Campaign methods
Given the high national profile that Sanders maintained since his 2016 campaign, NPR described him as "no longer an underdog" when he announced his 2020 campaign. Using the large email list it built during the 2016 campaign, the 2020 campaign recruited more than one million volunteers within weeks of its launch. It enlisted several former NowThis News employees to produce professional videos for wide social media distribution, live-streamed various forums to its millions of social media followers, and launched a podcast and smartphone app for grassroots organizing.

Fundraising
Sanders's 2020 campaign employed many of the same methods as its 2016 counterpart, eschewing a Super PAC and relying predominantly on small-dollar contributions. According to Federal Election Commission filings, the Sanders campaign had raised the most money in the 2020 Democratic field as of June 2019, including money left over from his 2018 Senate and 2016 presidential races. In September 2019, the Sanders campaign became the fastest in U.S. history to reach one million donors. On October 1, 2019, the campaign announced it had raised $25.3 million in the year's third quarter, with an average donation of $18. It was the largest quarterly sum raised by any Democratic candidate. The campaign raised $34.5 million during the fourth quarter of 2019.

Polls and news coverage

Sanders steadily polled between 15 and 20% on most national surveys between May and September 2019, according to the RealClearPolitics average. This placed him in a decisive second-place behind Joe Biden until Elizabeth Warren and Kamala Harris caught up in July. From mid-February 2020 to the start of March, Sanders polled in first place in the Democratic primary ahead of Joe Biden and was described by the press as the party's presidential front-runner.

According to a RealClearPolitics analysis, Sanders received the third-most mentions on CNN, Fox News, and MSNBC between January and August 2019, trailing only Joe Biden and Kamala Harris. Biden, however, received twice as many mentions as Sanders and Harris. Mentions of Sanders on ABC World News Tonight found him in second place, though also trailing Biden by a large margin. Online mentions "reflect a slightly more balanced picture", with both Sanders and Elizabeth Warren running "neck-and-neck" with Biden.

Forums and other appearances

On April 6, 2019, Sanders participated in a Fox News town hall that attracted more than 2.55 million viewers. His decision to appear on Fox was controversial given the Democratic National Committee's decision not to allow Fox to host any of its debates. His appearance saw an increase of Fox News viewers by 24% overall and 40% in the 25-to-54-year-old demographic, surpassing the ratings of all other Democratic presidential candidate town halls that year. As of September 2019, the town hall had received more than 1.5 million views on YouTube.

On August 6, 2019, Sanders appeared on The Joe Rogan Experience podcast. Some praised Rogan for "hosting a pragmatic discussion" while others "seemed rather stunned by Sanders's decision to appear on the show at all." After the podcast, Rogan became a top-trending Twitter topic. After interviewing him, Rogan said, "I am not right-wing ... I've interviewed right-wing people. I am 100% left-wing ... Bernie Sanders made a ton of sense to me and I would 100% vote for him." As of October 2019, the podcast had received more than ten million views on YouTube.

Presidential debates

In December 2018, the Democratic National Committee (DNC) announced the preliminary schedule for 12 official DNC-sanctioned debates, set to begin in June 2019, with six in 2019 and the remaining six during the first four months of 2020. During the July and September debates, commentators described Sanders and Elizabeth Warren as having a "non-aggression pact", staking out similar progressive positions in contrast to the more conservative candidates. In the October 15 debate, his first appearance since his heart attack, debate coach Todd Graham gave Sanders's performance an A, his highest rating of all the candidates.

CNN hosted the first 2020 debate in January with six candidates remaining. Co-moderator Abby Phillip questioned Sanders and Warren about an allegation Warren had made that he had privately told her that a woman could not defeat Donald Trump. Phillip asked Sanders, "Senator Sanders, CNN reported yesterday, and Senator Warren confirmed in a statement, that in 2018 you told her that you did not believe that a woman could win the election. Why did you say that?" Ignoring Sanders's strong denial, Phillip asked Warren, "What did you think when Bernie Sanders told you that a woman couldn't become president?" In an interview after the debate, Sanders called it ludicrous to believe that he would doubt a woman's ability to win the presidency and noted that a woman already had won the national popular vote, saying, "After all, Hillary Clinton beat Donald Trump by 3 million votes in 2016."

Suspension of campaign
Sanders announced that he was suspending his campaign on April 8, 2020. He stated that he would remain on the ballot in the remaining states and continue to accumulate delegates with the goal of influencing the Democratic Party's platform. On April 14 Sanders endorsed Biden. Biden responded, "I think that your endorsement means a great deal. It means a great deal to me. I think people are going to be surprised that we are apart on some issues but we're awfully close on a whole bunch of others. I'm going to need you—not just to win the campaign, but to govern."

Political positions

A self-described "democratic socialist", Sanders is a progressive who admires the Nordic model of social democracy and has been a proponent of workplace democracy via union democracy and worker cooperatives. He is a strong critic of contemporary neoliberal capitalism, which he calls "uber-capitalism", blaming it for such societal ills as declining life expectancy and rising diseases of despair. He advocates universal, single-payer healthcare, paid parental leave, and tuition-free tertiary education. He supports lowering the cost of drugs by reforming patent laws to allow cheaper generic versions to be sold in the U.S. He supported the Affordable Care Act, though he said it did not go far enough. In November 2015, he gave a speech at Georgetown University about his view of democratic socialism, including its place in the policies of presidents Franklin D. Roosevelt and Lyndon B. Johnson. Defining what "democratic socialism" means to him, Sanders said: "I don't believe government should take over the grocery store down the street or own the means of production, but I do believe that the middle class and the working families who produce the wealth of America deserve a decent standard of living and that their incomes should go up, not down. I do believe in private companies that thrive and invest and grow in America, companies that create jobs here, rather than companies that are shutting down in America and increasing their profits by exploiting low-wage labor abroad."

Based on his positions and votes throughout his career, many commentators consider his political platform primarily focused on tax-funded social benefits and not on social ownership of the means of production. Some socialists have described Sanders as a market socialist or reformist socialist, while others have called him a reformist social democrat. Some political commentators have described Sanders's political philosophy as "welfarism" or "social democracy". Others describe his philosophy as extending from such existing liberal programs in the U.S. as Social Security and Medicare, and more consistent with Nordic social democracy.

Bhaskar Sunkara has characterized Sanders' politics as "class struggle social democracy", arguing that while postwar social democracy operated as a compromise that instituted tripartite arrangements between business, labor and government to dampen class conflict, Sanders sees social democratic demands as a means to sharpening class confrontation and raising class consciousness. His views have been echoed by George Eaton, arguing that Sunkara's phrase "captures the nuances of Sanders' politics in a way that a socialist / social democrat binary does not" and asserting that if he was elected president it would represent "the triumph of a politics that is neither wholly socialist, nor social democratic, but a new fusion of both".

Climate change

Sanders views global warming as a serious problem, and advocates bold action to reverse its effects. He calls for substantial investment in infrastructure, with energy efficiency, sustainability, and job creation as prominent goals. He considers climate change the greatest threat to national security. He said that family planning can help fight climate change. He opposed the construction of the Dakota Access Pipeline on the grounds that, like the Keystone XL Pipeline, it "will have a significant impact on our climate." In 2019, he announced his support for Green New Deal legislation, and joined Representatives Alexandria Ocasio-Cortez and Earl Blumenauer in proposing legislation that would declare climate change a national and international emergency.

Economic issues
Sanders focuses on economic issues such as income and wealth inequality, poverty, raising the minimum wage, universal healthcare, cancelling all student debt, making public colleges and universities tuition-free by taxing financial transactions, and expanding Social Security benefits by eliminating the cap on the payroll tax on all incomes above $250,000. He has become a prominent supporter of laws requiring companies to give their workers parental leave, sick leave, and vacation time, noting that such laws have been adopted by nearly all other developed countries. He also supports legislation that would make it easier for workers to join or form a trade union. He was against the Troubled Asset Relief Program, and has called for comprehensive financial reforms, such as breaking up "too big to fail" financial institutions, restoring Glass–Steagall legislation, reforming the Federal Reserve Bank, and allowing the Post Office to offer basic financial services in economically marginalized communities.

Believing greater emphasis is needed on labor rights and environmental concerns when negotiating international trade agreements, Sanders voted against and has long spoken against NAFTA, CAFTA, and PNTR with China. He has called them a "disaster for the American worker", saying that they have resulted in American corporations moving abroad. He also opposes the Trans-Pacific Partnership, which he says was "written by corporate America and the pharmaceutical industry and Wall Street." On May 1, 2019, he tweeted: "Since the China trade deal I voted against, America has lost over three million manufacturing jobs. It's wrong to pretend that China isn't one of our major economic competitors."

Sanders also strongly opposes outsourcing American jobs. During discussions of the United States Innovation and Competition Act, which was to be used to fund the manufacture of semiconductors amid a shortage, he proposed a measure to ensure the companies the bill funded could not outsource their jobs. The proposed measure would also block the companies from forbidding their employees to unionize. Sanders's proposal was voted down by most Democrats and all Republicans in the Senate. Ahead of the 2022 midterms, Sanders said he wants the Democratic Party to focus more on supporting unionization: "I think we should move to a system where, if 50% of the workers in a bargaining unit plus one vote to form a union, they have a union. End of discussion."

Foreign relations

Sanders supports reducing military spending while pursuing more diplomacy and international cooperation. He opposed funding Nicaraguan rebels, known as contras, in the CIA's covert war against Nicaragua's leftist government. He opposed the U.S. invasion of Iraq and has criticized a number of policies instituted during the War on Terror, particularly that of mass surveillance and the USA Patriot Act. He criticized Israel's actions during the 2014 Gaza war and U.S. involvement in the Saudi Arabian-led intervention in Yemen. On November 15, 2015, in response to the Islamic State of Iraq and the Levant (ISIL)'s attacks in Paris, he cautioned against Islamophobia and said, "We gotta be tough, not stupid" in the war against ISIL, adding that the U.S. should continue to welcome Syrian refugees. He criticized the January 2020 drone assassination of Iranian general Qasem Soleimani, calling it a dangerous escalation of tensions that could lead to an expensive war.

Sanders supports Palestinian rights and has criticized Israel on several occasions. In 2020, he called the American Israel Public Affairs Committee a platform for bigotry and said he would not attend its conference. He condemned Trump's decision to recognize Jerusalem as Israel's capital, saying, "It would dramatically undermine the prospects for an Israeli-Palestinian peace agreement, and severely, perhaps irreparably, damage the United States' ability to broker that peace."

Addressing Westminster College in a September 2017 speech, Sanders laid out a foreign policy plan for greater international collaboration, adherence to U.S.-led international agreements such as the Paris Agreement and the Iran nuclear deal framework, and promoting human rights and democratic ideals. He emphasized the consequences associated with global economic inequality and climate change, and urged reining in the use of U.S. military power, saying it "must always be a last resort". He also criticized U.S. support for "murderous regimes" during the Cold War, such as those in Iran, Chile and El Salvador, and said that those actions continue to make the U.S. less safe. He also spoke critically of Russian interference in the 2016 U.S. elections and the way President Trump has handled the crisis. He does not consider Turkey a U.S. ally, and condemned the Turkish military offensive against U.S.-aligned Kurdish forces in northeastern Syria.

Gun laws
Sanders supports closing the "gun show loophole", banning assault weapons, and passing and enforcing universal federal background checks for gun purchases. In 1990, he was supported by the National Rifle Association in his bid to become a U.S. Representative in exchange for opposing both the competing campaign of Peter Smith, who had reversed his stance on firearm restrictions, and waiting periods for handgun purchases. In 1993, while a U.S. Representative, he voted against the Brady Handgun Violence Prevention Act (which established background checks and wait periods), and in 2005 voted for legislation that gave gun manufacturers legal immunity against claims of negligence, but  he has since said that he would support repealing that law. In 1996, he voted against additional funding to the Centers for Disease Control and Prevention for research on issues related to firearms, but in 2016, he called for an increase in CDC funding for the study of gun violence.

Social issues
On social issues, Sanders has long taken liberal stances. He considers himself a feminist, is pro-choice on abortion, and opposes defunding Planned Parenthood. He has long advocated for LGBT rights; in 2009, he supported legalizing same-sex marriage in Vermont. Sanders has denounced institutional racism and called for criminal justice reform to reduce the number of people in prison, advocates a crackdown on police brutality, and supports abolishing private, for-profit prisons and the death penalty. He supports Black Lives Matter. He also supports legalizing marijuana at the federal level. He has advocated for greater democratic participation by citizens, campaign finance reform, and a constitutional amendment or judicial decision that would overturn Citizens United v. FEC.

Trump administration
Sanders criticized President Trump for appointing multiple billionaires to his cabinet. He criticized Trump's rolling back President Obama's Clean Power Plan, noting the scientifically reported effect on climate change of human activity and citing Trump's calling those reports a hoax. He called for caution on the Syrian Civil War, saying, "It's easier to get into a war than out of one." In 2017, he promised to defeat "Trump and Trumpism and the Republican right-wing ideology".

Sanders gave an online reply to Trump's January 2018 State of the Union address in which he called Trump "compulsively dishonest" and criticized him for initiating "a looming immigration crisis" by ending the Deferred Action for Childhood Arrivals program. He voiced concern about Trump's failure to mention the finding that Russia had interfered in the 2016 election and "will likely interfere in the 2018 midterms we will be holding ... Unless you have a very special relationship with Mr. Putin."

On January 6, 2021, Trump supporters attacked the United States Capitol. Sanders commented: "[Trump] has made it clear that he will do anything to remain in power – including insurrection and inciting violence [and he] will go down in history as the worst and most dangerous president in history."

Sanders voted to convict Trump on both articles of his first impeachment trial in 2020 (for pressuring a foreign leader to investigate Joe Biden), and again on the sole article of his second impeachment trial in 2021 (for inciting the Capitol attack).

Biden administration
Sanders influenced the environmental policy goals of the Biden administration as described before Biden's nomination. Biden's policy team took some but not all of the Biden-Sanders Unity Task Forces' climate recommendations.

After Biden was elected president, Sanders became the subject of speculation over a potential appointment as Labor Secretary, which was supported by several progressive groups, such as the Sunrise Movement. For his part, Sanders said that he would accept Biden's nomination if it was offered, but Boston mayor Marty Walsh was chosen for the position instead. When announcing Walsh's nomination, Biden confirmed that he had discussed the position with Sanders, but the two agreed that Sanders's resignation from the Senate and the ensuing special election would have put the Democrats' slim Senate majority at risk.

On February 23, 2021, Sanders became the first senator in the Democratic caucus to oppose one of Biden's cabinet picks when he voted against Tom Vilsack's confirmation as Agriculture Secretary, citing concerns about Vilsack's past work as a lobbyist and ties to large corporations.

Sanders strongly supported Senate Democrats' decision to use budget reconciliation, a procedure used to avoid filibusters, to pass the American Rescue Plan Act of 2021, despite having criticized Republicans' use of reconciliation to pass the 2017 tax cuts. The bill passed the Senate by a 50–49 vote and was signed into law by Biden on March 11, 2021.

Sanders has continued to have a strong influence on the Biden administration. When it was noted that he had become a key voice in Biden's administration, he replied, "As somebody who wrote a book called Outsider in the House, yes, it is a strange experience to be having that kind of influence that we have now." Their relationship has lasted over 30 years and Sanders has said it is based on respect and trust: "We have had a good relationship. He wants to be a champion of working families, and I admire that and respect that."

Before the 2022 midterm election, Sanders said he regarded it as deciding the fate of democracy, abortion, and climate change, calling it "the most consequential midterm election" of modern U.S. history. He expressed a fear that the Democratic Party had "not done a good enough job" of getting its message out "to young people and working-class people." After the election, Sanders said it "went a hell of a lot better than we had anticipated" and that "discussion about the economy" had "a very strong impact" that helped Democrats. He also pointed to John Fetterman's successful campaign as a model for future Democratic efforts, saying that Fetterman had "strongly identified with the working class" during the Pennsylvania election.

Party affiliations
Born into a Democratic-voting family, Sanders was first introduced to political activism when his brother Larry joined the Young Democrats of America and campaigned for Adlai Stevenson II in 1956. Sanders joined Vermont's Liberty Union Party in 1971 and was a candidate for several offices, never coming close to winning election. He became party chairman, but quit in 1977 to become an independent. In 1980, he served as an elector for the Socialist Workers Party. In 1981, Sanders ran as an independent for mayor of Burlington, Vermont, and defeated the Democratic incumbent; he was reelected three times. Although an independent, he endorsed Democratic presidential candidates Walter Mondale in 1984 and Jesse Jackson in 1988. His endorsement of Mondale was lukewarm (telling reporters that "if you go around saying that Mondale would be a great president, you would be a liar and a hypocrite"), but he supported Jackson enthusiastically. The Washington Post reported that the Jackson campaign helped inspire Sanders to work more closely with the Democratic Party.

Sanders attended the 1983 conference of the Socialist Party USA where he gave a speech.

Sanders first ran for the U.S. House of Representatives in 1988 and for the U.S. Senate in 2006, each time adopting a strategy of winning the Democratic Party primary, thereby eliminating Democratic challengers, and then running as an independent in the general election. He continued this strategy through his reelection in the 2018 United States Senate election in Vermont. Throughout his tenure in Congress, he has been listed as an independent. He caucused with Democrats in the House while refusing to join the party, and continues to caucus with Democrats in the Senate. Some conservative southern House Democrats initially barred him from the caucus as they believed that allowing a self-described socialist to join would harm their electoral prospects. He soon came to work constructively with Democrats, voting with the party over 90% of the time during his tenure in Congress.

Starting with his 2016 presidential campaign, Sanders's announcements suggested that not only was he running as a Democrat, but that he would run as a Democrat in future elections. When challenged by Clinton about his party commitment, he said, "Of course I am a Democrat and running for the Democratic nomination." Since he remained a senator elected as an independent, his U.S. Senate website and press materials continued to refer to him as an independent during the campaign and upon his return to the Senate. In October 2017, Sanders said he would run for reelection as an independent in 2018 despite pressure to run as a Democrat. His party status became ambiguous again in March 2019 when he signed a formal "loyalty pledge" to the Democratic Party stating that he was a member of the party and would serve as a Democrat if elected president. He signed the pledge the day after he signed paperwork to run as an independent for reelection to the Senate in 2024.

After Trump's victory in the 2016 elections, Sanders suggested the Democratic Party undergo a series of reforms and that it "break loose from its corporate establishment ties and, once again, become a grass-roots party of working people, the elderly and the poor." He drew parallels between his campaign and that of the Labour Party in the 2017 UK general election. He wrote in The New York Times that "the British elections should be a lesson for the Democratic Party" and urged the Democrats to stop holding on to an "overly cautious, centrist ideology", arguing that "momentum shifted to Labour after it released a very progressive manifesto that generated much enthusiasm among young people and workers." He had earlier praised Jeremy Corbyn's stance on class issues. Sanders is one of three independents in the Senate, the others being Angus King, who also caucuses with the Democrats, and Kyrsten Sinema.

Personal life

In 1963, Sanders and Deborah Shiling Messing, whom he met in college, volunteered for several months on the Israeli kibbutz Sha'ar HaAmakim. They married in 1964 and bought a summer home in Vermont; they had no children and divorced in 1966. His son (and only biological child), Levi Sanders, was born in 1969 to then-girlfriend Susan Campbell Mott.

On May 28, 1988, Sanders married Jane O'Meara Driscoll, who later became president of Burlington College, in Burlington, Vermont. The day after their wedding, the couple visited the Soviet Union as part of an official delegation in his capacity as mayor. They own a row house in Capitol Hill, a house in Burlington's New North End neighborhood, and a lakefront summer home in North Hero. He considers Jane's three children—Dave Driscoll (born 1975), Carina Driscoll (born 1974), and Heather Titus (1971)—to be his own.

Sanders's elder brother, Larry, lives in England; he was a Green Party county councillor, representing the East Oxford division on Oxfordshire County Council, until he retired from the council in 2013. Larry ran as a Green Party candidate for Oxford West and Abingdon in the 2015 British general election and came in fifth. Bernie Sanders told CNN, "I owe my brother an enormous amount. It was my brother who actually introduced me to a lot of my ideas."

Health
On October 1, 2019, Sanders was hospitalized after experiencing chest pains at a campaign event in Las Vegas. His campaign announced the next day that a blockage had been found in one coronary artery and two stents inserted. Scheduled campaign events and appearances were canceled until further notice. Two days later his campaign released a statement that he had been diagnosed with a heart attack. He was released from the hospital the same day. The statement included the following from Sanders's doctors:

A few days after returning home, Sanders addressed media outside his home and said he had experienced fatigue and chest discomfort for a month or two before the incident; he expressed regret for not seeking medical assessment sooner: "I was dumb."

Sanders made his first national appearance after his heart attack on October 15 at the Democratic debate, at which he said, "I'm healthy, I'm feeling great." When asked how he would reassure voters about his health and ability to take on the duties of the presidency, he said, "We are going to be mounting a vigorous campaign all over this country. That is how I think I can reassure the American people." It was noted that he was "lively and sharp at the debate."

In December 2019, three months after the heart attack, Sanders released letters from three physicians, Attending Physician of Congress Brian P. Monahan and two cardiologists, who declared Sanders healthy and recovered from his heart condition.

Honors and awards
On December 4, 2015, Sanders won Times 2015 Person of the Year readers' poll with 10.2% of the vote but did not receive the editorial board's award. On March 20, 2016, he was given an honorary Coast Salish name, by Deborah Parker in Seattle to honor his focus on Native American issues during his presidential campaign.

On May 30, 2017, Sanders received an honorary degree of Doctor of Humane Letters from Brooklyn College.

Religion, heritage, and values
As Sanders described his upbringing as an American Jew in a 2016 speech: his father generally attended synagogue only on Yom Kippur; he attended public schools while his mother "chafed" at his yeshiva Sunday schooling at a Hebrew school; and their religious observances were mostly limited to Passover seders with their neighbors. Larry Sanders said of their parents, "They were very pleased to be Jews, but didn't have a strong belief in God." Bernie had a bar mitzvah at the historic Kingsway Jewish Center in Midwood, Brooklyn, where he grew up.

In 1963, in cooperation with the Labor Zionist youth movement Hashomer Hatzair, Sanders and his first wife volunteered at Sha'ar HaAmakim, a kibbutz in northern Israel. His motivation for the trip was as much socialistic as it was Zionistic.

As mayor of Burlington, Sanders allowed a Chabad public menorah to be placed at city hall, an action the ACLU contested. He publicly inaugurated the Hanukkah menorah and performed the Jewish religious ritual of blessing Hanukkah candles. His early and strong support played a significant role in the now widespread public menorah celebrations around the globe. When asked about his Jewish heritage, Sanders has said that he is "proud to be Jewish."

Sanders rarely speaks about religion. He describes himself as "not particularly religious" and "not actively involved" with organized religion. A press package issued by his office states his religion as Jewish. He has said he believes in God, but not necessarily in a traditional way: "I think everyone believes in God in their own ways", he said. "To me, it means that all of us are connected, all of life is connected, and that we are all tied together." In October 2015, on the late-night talk show Jimmy Kimmel Live!, Kimmel asked him, "You say you are culturally Jewish and you don't feel religious; do you believe in God and do you think that's important to the people of the United States?" Sanders replied:

In 2016, he disclosed that he had "very strong religious and spiritual feelings", adding, "My spirituality is that we are all in this together and that when children go hungry, when veterans sleep out on the street, it impacts me."

Sanders does not regularly attend synagogue, and he does not refrain from working on Rosh Hashanah, as observant Jews do. He has attended yahrzeit observances in memory of the deceased, for the father of a friend, and in 2015 attended a Tashlikh, an atonement ceremony, with the mayor of Lynchburg on the afternoon of Rosh Hashanah. According to Richard Sugarman, his Jewish identity is "certainly more ethnic and cultural than religious." His wife is Roman Catholic, and he has often expressed admiration for Pope Francis, saying that "the leader of the Catholic Church is raising profound issues. It is important that we listen to what he has said." He has said he feels very close to Francis's economic teachings, describing him as "incredibly smart and brave". In April 2016, he accepted an invitation from Marcelo Sánchez Sorondo, an aide close to Francis, to speak at a Vatican conference on economic and environmental issues. While at the Vatican, he met briefly with Francis.

In popular culture
In December 1987, during his tenure as mayor of Burlington, Sanders recorded a folk album, We Shall Overcome, with 30 Vermont musicians. As he was not a skilled singer, he performed his vocals in a talking blues style.

Internet culture
Owing to his two high-profile campaigns in the 2016 and 2020 Democratic primaries, Sanders and his campaigns have generated many Internet memes and other online content. The Facebook group Bernie Sanders' Dank Meme Stash, where users can submit memes focused around Sanders, received significant attention in the 2016 primary season due to the at-the-time unique idea of a meme community focused entirely on a politician. During the 2020 primary season, a still from a fundraising video in which Sanders tells the viewers "I am once again asking for your financial support" went viral online, with numerous edits made of the frame. The day before Super Tuesday 2020, a video of the Twitch streamer Neekolul wearing a Bernie 2020 shirt and lip-syncing the song "Oki Doki Boomer" also went viral. In 2021, a frame from the inauguration of Joe Biden showing Sanders seated in a folding chair wearing patterned mittens and a jacket reminiscent of the one in the "I am once again asking" meme went viral, with the image captioned or edited into other images, most commonly popular movie scenes.

In film and television
Sanders appeared in a cameo role in the 1988 comedy-drama film Sweet Hearts Dance, playing a man who distributes candy to young trick-or-treaters. In 1999, he acted in the film My X-Girlfriend's Wedding Reception, playing Rabbi Manny Shevitz. In this role he mourned the Brooklyn Dodgers' move to Los Angeles, reflecting Sanders's own upbringing in Brooklyn. On February 6, 2016, he was a guest star alongside Larry David on Saturday Night Live, playing a Polish immigrant on a steamship that was sinking near the Statue of Liberty.

In the DC Extended Universe film Birds of Prey (and the Fantabulous Emancipation of One Harley Quinn), one of the reasons Roman Sionis wants Harley Quinn dead is that she "voted for Bernie".

Publications
 With Huck Gutman,  
 In

See also

 American Left
 Electoral history of Bernie Sanders
 History of the socialist movement in the United States
 List of elected socialist mayors in the United States
 List of Jewish members of the United States Congress
 List of people who received an electoral vote in the United States Electoral College
 Spintharus berniesandersi
 Third-party members of the United States House of Representatives

Explanatory notes

References

Further reading

External links

Official
 U.S. Senate website
 Campaign website

Other
 
 
 Column archive at The Huffington Post
 Issue positions and quotes at On the Issues
 Fact-checking at PolitiFact.com

 
1941 births
Living people
20th-century American male writers
20th-century American non-fiction writers
20th-century American politicians
21st-century American male writers
21st-century American non-fiction writers
21st-century American politicians
Activists for African-American civil rights
Activists from New York (state)
Activists from Vermont
American anti–Iraq War activists
American carpenters
American democratic socialists
American environmentalists
American feminists
American filmmakers
American gun control activists
American male non-fiction writers
American people of Polish-Jewish descent
American people of Russian-Jewish descent
American political writers
American public access television personalities
American social democrats
American television hosts
Articles containing video clips
American Ashkenazi Jews
Candidates in the 2016 United States presidential election
Candidates in the 2020 United States presidential election
Democratic Party United States senators from Vermont
Harvard University faculty
HuffPost writers and columnists
Independent members of the United States House of Representatives
Independent United States senators
James Madison High School (Brooklyn) alumni
Jewish American activists
Jewish American candidates for President of the United States
Jewish American government officials
Jewish American people in Vermont politics
Jewish American writers
Jewish anti-racism activists
Jewish feminists
Jewish human rights activists
Jewish mayors of places in the United States
Jewish members of the United States House of Representatives
Jewish socialists
Jewish United States senators
Jews and Judaism in Burlington, Vermont
American LGBT rights activists
Liberty Union Party politicians
Male feminists
Mayors of Burlington, Vermont
Members of the United States House of Representatives from Vermont
People from Flatbush, Brooklyn
People from Midwood, Brooklyn
Politicians from Brooklyn
Progressivism in the United States
Secular Jews
Television producers from New York City
University of Chicago alumni
Vermont Democrats
Vermont Independents
Vermont socialists
Writers from Brooklyn
Writers from Vermont
Left-wing populism in the United States